Jack "Goose" Givens (born September 21, 1956) is an American former professional basketball player. He played college basketball for the Kentucky Wildcats, earning consensus second-team All-American honors. He led the team to the 1978 NCAA Men's Division I Basketball Championship and was named that year's Final Four Most Outstanding Player due in most part to his 41-point performance in Kentucky's 94–88 victory over Duke in the championship game. He was a 6'5" (1.96 m), 205 lb (93 kg) forward. Givens played professionally for the Atlanta Hawks of the National Basketball Association (NBA). He also played overseas in Japan.

Biography

Collegiate career

Givens earned Kentucky Mr. Basketball and Parade All-American honors after his senior year at Lexington's Bryan Station High School in 1974. In his freshman year at the University of Kentucky, the Wildcats finished as national runners-up, falling 92–85 to UCLA in the 1975 Final Four championship game. In 1978, Givens and Kentucky returned to the Final Four at the Checkerdome in St. Louis, Missouri. After leading Kentucky to a semifinal victory over the Arkansas, he scored a career-high 41 points and made 18 of 27 field goal attempts against Duke to help Kentucky clinch their fifth NCAA Championship in men's basketball.

Givens lettered four times in varsity basketball from 1974–75 to 1977–78. In that span, he scored 2,038 points in 123 games (16.6 ppg), ranking third on the school's all-time scoring list. He was named first team all-Southeastern Conference three times from 1976 to 1978 and was a consensus second-team All-American in 1978. Kentucky retired Givens' #21 jersey and a banner in his honor hangs in the rafters of Rupp Arena, Kentucky's home court.

NBA career
Following his collegiate career, the Atlanta Hawks drafted Givens with the 16th overall pick in the 1978 NBA draft. He played two years for the Hawks, scoring 1,040 points in 156 games (6.7 ppg).

Italy, Belgium and Japan
Givens played for the Akita Isuzu Motors basketball team of Japan, where he still returns regularly with his family to visit the friends he made there, in 1982–83.

Broadcasting
After his playing career, Givens was an NBA television color analyst for various networks and teams, most notably with the Turner Broadcasting System (TBS) and the Orlando Magic for both the Sun Sports and FS Florida cable stations from the team's inception in 1989 to 2004 before being replaced by Matt Guokas.

Personal life
Givens is the CEO and President of Orlando Comets, a basketball organization that has placed over 60 players into NCAA basketball on full scholarships. In 2006, the Orlando Comets won the national AAU Championship in the 16 and under division. Jack and his wife Linda have two children, Jeremy and Jaimie. In September 2005, a jury acquitted Givens of sexual battery charges.

References

External links

1956 births
Living people
African-American basketball players
Akita Isuzu/Isuzu Motors Lynx/Giga Cats players
All-American college men's basketball players
American expatriate basketball people in Belgium
American expatriate basketball people in Italy
American expatriate basketball people in Japan
American men's basketball players
Atlanta Hawks draft picks
Atlanta Hawks players
Basketball players from Lexington, Kentucky
Bryan Station High School alumni
College basketball announcers in the United States
Dallas Mavericks expansion draft picks
Kentucky Wildcats men's basketball players
National Basketball Association broadcasters
Orlando Magic announcers
Parade High School All-Americans (boys' basketball)
Small forwards
Sportspeople from Lexington, Kentucky
21st-century African-American people
20th-century African-American sportspeople